Worlds Without End is a novel by Caroline Spector published by Roc Fantasy in 1995.

Plot summary
Worlds Without End is a Shadowrun novel and is the last part of a trilogy that begins in the world of Earthdawn, although the two preceding novels were released after this one.

Reception
Andy Butcher reviewed Worlds Without End for Arcane magazine, rating it a 5 out of 10 overall. Butcher comments that "As the first real cross-over between Earthdawn and Shadowrun, Worlds Without End is something of a disappointment. It starts well and reveals some interesting details about the real powers in the world of Shadowrun, but the climax arrives all too soon, and is less than stunning. Part of the problem is that you're left with the distinct feeling that you've missed a lof of what's going on - perhaps once the two prequels have been released, it'll all make a bit more sense..."

References

1995 novels
Novels based on role-playing games
Roc Books books
Shadowrun